The Keeper's Price and Other Stories is an anthology of fantasy and science fiction short stories edited by Marion Zimmer Bradley. The stories are set in Bradley's world of Darkover. The book was first published by DAW Books in February 1980. Many of the stories first appeared in the magazine Starstone.

Contents
 Introduction: "A Word from the Creator of Darkover" by Marion Zimmer Bradley

Sources
 
 
 

Darkover books
1980 anthologies
American anthologies
Works by Marion Zimmer Bradley
Books with cover art by Don Maitz
DAW Books books